This is a list of nature reserves in Ireland.

The lists below shows the names and locations of nature reserves in Ireland. A nature reserve in Ireland is a designated area of importance to wildlife, protected by a ministerial order. The majority of these reserves are owned by the state, but some are under the ownership of organisations or in private ownership. The first reserves were established under the 1976 Wildlife Act. They are designated and managed by the National Parks and Wildlife Division of Duchas and Department of Culture, Heritage and Gaeltacht. All these designated reserves are Natural Heritage Areas (NHAs), with some of them also listed as Special Areas of Conservation (SACs).

Connacht

Leinster

Munster

Ulster

See also
 Conservation in the Republic of Ireland
 List of national parks of the Republic of Ireland
 List of Special Areas of Conservation in the Republic of Ireland

Sources
 Nature Reserves data set from the Department of Culture, Heritage and the Gaeltacht

References

Ireland
Nature reserves
Nature reserves